Bungulla is a genus of Australian armored trapdoor spiders first described by Michael Gordon Rix, Robert J. Raven, Barbara York Main & Mark Stephen Harvey in 2017.

Species
 it contains thirty-two species:
Bungulla ajana Rix, Raven & Harvey, 2018 — Australia (Western Australia)
Bungulla aplini Rix, Raven & Harvey, 2018 — Australia (Western Australia)
Bungulla banksia Rix, Raven & Harvey, 2018 — Australia (Western Australia)
Bungulla bella Rix, Raven & Harvey, 2018 — Australia (Western Australia)
Bungulla bertmaini Rix, Main, Raven & Harvey, 2017 — Australia (Western Australia)
Bungulla bidgemia Rix, Raven & Harvey, 2018 — Australia (Western Australia)
Bungulla biota Rix, Raven & Harvey, 2018 — Australia (Western Australia)
Bungulla bringo Rix, Raven & Harvey, 2018 — Australia (Western Australia)
Bungulla burbidgei Rix, Raven & Harvey, 2018 — Australia (Western Australia)
Bungulla dipsodes Rix, Raven & Harvey, 2018 — Australia (Western Australia)
Bungulla disrupta Rix, Raven & Harvey, 2018 — Australia (Western Australia)
Bungulla ferraria Rix, Raven & Harvey, 2018 — Australia (Western Australia)
Bungulla fusca Rix, Raven & Harvey, 2018 — Australia (Western Australia)
Bungulla gibba Rix, Raven & Harvey, 2018 — Australia (Western Australia)
Bungulla hamelinensis Rix, Raven & Harvey, 2018 — Australia (Western Australia)
Bungulla harrisonae Rix, Raven & Harvey, 2018 — Australia (Western Australia)
Bungulla hillyerae Rix, Raven & Harvey, 2018 — Australia (Western Australia)
Bungulla inermis Rix, Raven & Harvey, 2018 — Australia (Western Australia)
Bungulla iota Rix, Raven & Harvey, 2018 — Australia (Western Australia)
Bungulla keigheryi Rix, Raven & Harvey, 2018 — Australia (Western Australia)
Bungulla keirani Rix, Raven & Harvey, 2018 — Australia (Western Australia)
Bungulla kendricki Rix, Raven & Harvey, 2018 — Australia (Western Australia)
Bungulla laevigata Rix, Raven & Harvey, 2018 — Australia (Western Australia)
Bungulla mackenziei Rix, Raven & Harvey, 2018 — Australia (Western Australia)
Bungulla oraria Rix, Raven & Harvey, 2018 — Australia (Western Australia)
Bungulla parva Rix, Raven & Harvey, 2018 — Australia (Western Australia)
Bungulla quobba Rix, Raven & Harvey, 2018 — Australia (Western Australia)
Bungulla riparia (Main, 1957) — Australia (Western Australia)
Bungulla sampeyae Rix, Raven & Harvey, 2018 — Australia (Western Australia)
Bungulla weld Rix, Raven & Harvey, 2018 — Australia (Western Australia)
Bungulla westi Rix, Raven & Harvey, 2018 — Australia (Western Australia)
Bungulla yeni Rix, Raven & Harvey, 2018 — Australia (Western Australia)

References

Idiopidae
Mygalomorphae genera